Acropora kimbeensis is a species of acroporid coral that was first described by Dr. Carden Wallace in 1999. It is listed as a vulnerable species on the IUCN Red List, and it is thought to have a decreasing population. It is not common and found over a large area, and is listed on CITES Appendix II.

Description
Acropora kimbeensis is found in compact colonies in bush-like structures. It is yellow, blue, or cream in colour, and the branches are upward-facing, become thinner towards the ends, and are caespitosed. The branchlets contain small, obvious axial corallites, and the incipient axial corallites are spaced equally. Radial corallites are present up the sides of the branchlets, and each contains a small opening (below  in size). It looks similar to Acropora cerealis and Acropora subulata. It reaches maturity at between three and eight years, and lives for more than ten years.

Distribution
Acropora kimbeensis is found over a large area but is uncommon; the Indo-Pacific, the East China Sea, west Pacific, Eastern Australia, Southeast Asia, Papua New Guinea, Osprey Reef Coral Sea, Micronesia, and Pohnpei. It occurs in one region of Indonesia, and at two sites of the Marshall Islands. There is a lack of population data for the species, but it is known to be declining. In 2005, 1,282 live specimens were exported for use in aquariums. It is affected by bleaching by rising sea temperatures, coral disease, climate change, pollution, human development, fishing, infrastructure, and being exported. It is listed as a vulnerable species on the IUCN Red List and is listed under CITES Appendix II, and can occur within Marine Protected Areas.

Taxonomy
It was first described by C. C. Wallace in 1999 as Acropora kimbeensis in the Indo-Pacific.

References

Acropora
Animals described in 1999
Vulnerable animals